Hoeryong Station is a metro station on Seoul Subway Line 1. In July 2012 it became a transfer station to the U Line. It lies in the city of Uijeongbu.

References 

Seoul Metropolitan Subway stations
Railway stations opened in 1986
Metro stations in Uijeongbu